The UK Albums Chart is a record chart based on weekly album sales in the United Kingdom; during the 1970s, a total of 148 albums reached number one. In October 1971, Imagine by John Lennon and The Plastic Ono Band became the 100th album to top the UK chart; seven years later, Nightflight to Venus by Boney M. became the 200th album to do so.

Number ones

By artist

Five artists spent 20 weeks or more at number one on the albums chart during the 1970s.

By record label
Eight record labels spent 20 weeks or more at number one on the albums chart during the 1970s.

Notes

References

External links
Archive of all UK Number One Albums of the 1970s with images of original packaging
Official UK Albums Top 100 at the Official Charts Company

1970s in British music
UK Albums
1970s